WBMR is a radio station located in Telford, Pennsylvania, United States, that broadcasts to the Philadelphia area. WBMR specializes in religious musical programming. It is an affiliate of the VCY America Radio Network. The callsign stands for BuxMont Radio as its community of license, the borough of Telford, straddles the Bucks and Montgomery county boundary.

External links
Unofficial WBMR station information

BMR
BMR